Fire and Rescue New South Wales (previously known as New South Wales Fire Brigades), an agency of the Government of New South Wales, Australia, is responsible for firefighting, rescue and HazMat services in the major cities, metropolitan areas and towns across New South Wales. Fire and Rescue NSW is the fourth largest urban fire service in the world, with over 6,800 firefighters serving at 335 fire stations throughout the state, supported by 465 administrative and trades staff and 5,700 community fire unit volunteers. FRNSW are also the busiest fire service in Australia, attending over 124,000 incidents a year.

The agency operates under the Fire and Rescue Act 1989, with a substantial history dating back well over 100 years to the establishment of the New South Wales Fire Brigades in 1910, and the Metropolitan Fire Brigade prior to that in 1884. The organisation is led by the Commissioner of Fire and Rescue NSW, currently Paul Baxter QSO, who reports to the Hon. Steph Cooke MP, Minister for Emergency Services and Resilience.

History 
Early firefighting in New South Wales was made up of a number of small insurance and volunteer based fire brigades located predominantly around central Sydney. Following a series of major fires, most notably the Garden Palace Fire in 1882, firefighting in Sydney was formalised into one organisation on 14 February 1884, the Metropolitan Fire Brigade (MFB). The MFB initially operated out of the former Insurance Brigade Headquarters on Bathurst Street, but soon began to seek new locations for expansion. The first station opened by the MFB was No. 3 Stanmore (initially known as Marrickville) in 1886. This was soon followed by the construction of their new Headquarters on Castlereagh Street (No. 1 Station) in 1888, which remains New South Wales' oldest operational fire station to this day.

In 1910, the Fire Brigades Act was extended to cover not just Sydney but the entire state of New South Wales. The Metropolitan Fire Brigade as a result became the New South Wales Fire Brigades (NSWFB). The organisation continued to grow, with many towns across the state seeking to establish permanent fire services often after major fires of their own. The NSWFB's expansion continued through the early 20th century, and it soon became responsible for hundreds of stations and thousands of firefighters even despite significant post-war cuts in 1945. 
Through the mid to late 20th century, NSWFB firefighters faced some of the most dangerous and deadly emergencies in the state's history, including the 1979 Luna Park Ghost Train Fire, the 1977 Granville Rail Disaster, the 1981 Sylvania Heights Nursing Home Fire, the 1981 Rembrandt Hostel Fire, the 1989 Downunder Hostel Fire and the 1989 Newcastle Earthquake, along with countless major bushfire emergencies including the 1968, 1974/75, 1979 and 1980 bushfire seasons.

The 1990s and early 2000s saw significant changes in the NSWFB and in firefighting as a whole. Development in training and equipment saw the more widespread use of Breathing Apparatus and Thermal Imaging Cameras, along with improved Personal Protective Equipment and more modern appliances. In 1991, NSWFB took over primary rescue response from the NSW Police in a number of areas in Sydney. This saw a shift in the brigade, as they began to increase their capabilities in general and specialist rescue. This period also saw a number of major emergencies across the state, including the 1991 Palm Grove Hostel Fire, the 1994 Bushfires, the 1995 Speed Street Fire, the 1997 Thredbo Landslide, the 1997 Bushfires, the 1999 Glenbrook Train Derailment, the 1999 Sydney Hailstorm, the 2001 Bushfires, the 2002/03 Bushfires, the 2003 Waterfall rail accident and the 2006 Bushfires.

In 2011, following the brigade taking over primary rescue services from NSW Ambulance in Sydney, Newcastle and Wollongong, the New South Wales Fire Brigades was renamed Fire and Rescue NSW (FRNSW), to better reflect its increasing rescue responsibilities. There was also a focus on further development of Personal Protective Equipment; new protective clothing featuring a Nomex and Kevlar blend called Titan, combined with an inner moisture barrier to prevent steam burns in 2013, new MSA and Pac Fire Firefighting and General Purpose Helmets in 2015, MSA Breathing Apparatus sets in 2017, and flash hoods and firefighting gloves in 2018. In 2016, FRNSW rolled out Mobile Data Terminals to every station to improve firefighter access to information including resources, call details, advanced maps, weather radars and data sheets.

FRNSW have been working to incorporate further new technologies into their fleet, including the development of their two high tech Mobile Command Centres, the incorporation of Compressed Air Foam Systems into their appliances, the implementation of a remote Turbine Assisted Firefighting Unit, the development of the Hytrans Bulk Water Transfer System, and the development of Remote Piloted Aircraft systems. In 2016, FRNSW relocated their Headquarters to a brand new building at Greenacre, which serves as a modern workspace for both operational and administrative staff. This was followed in 2018 by the construction of the new Emergency Services Academy in Orchard Hills, which provides firefighters with a modern practical learning environment to maintain and improve safety and skills. In 2018, FRNSW rolled out the ‘Plus Plan’, an organisational strategy to develop an internal model for success and community education with an emphasis on these new roles and technologies.

Emblem 
The Fire and Rescue NSW emblem includes the NSW state emblem with the State motto Orta Recens Quam Pura Nites, which is Latin for 'Newly Risen How Brightly We Shine'.

A flag based on the British Blue Ensign with the FRNSW emblem is also used.

Ranks
Firefighters

Retained firefighters

Commissioner
The Commissioner's official vehicle bears number plate 10, which has been on continuous issue to the head of the fire department from Transport for NSW and its predecessors since 1910.

Paul Baxter  was appointed Commissioner of Fire and Rescue NSW on 16 January 2017. He was previously National Commander of the New Zealand Fire Service and the National Rural Fire Authority.

Organisation
Staffing

Fire and Rescue NSW operate two levels of staffing, Permanent and Retained. Permanent Firefighters are full-time career crews who work predominately 24 hour shifts. Each permanent station is made up of four platoons, A B C & D. Each station is assigned a minimum of one Pumper with a crew of 3 firefighters and a station officer per shift. Some multi appliance stations such as City of Sydney can have as many as 20 firefighters on a platoon. Permanent stations are typically located in Metropolitan areas (Such as Sydney and Newcastle) and Regional centres (Such as Lismore and Dubbo).

Retained Firefighters are part-time on call crews, who are notified by pager and travel to the fire station from home or work when an emergency occurs. Retained firefighters are predominantly located in outer Metropolitan and Regional areas. Retained firefighters operate off an availability roster, where each firefighter has to give their available hours for the day/week. This system ensures that there is always a minimum safe crew of four Retained Firefighters available to turnout at any given time. A number of stations, particularly in regional areas, have a mix of both Permanent and Retained crews, who work together and often provide backup for one another.

Zones

Stations in New South Wales are organised geographically (often by LGA) into zones which are spread around the state. Each zone consists of between 10 and 20 stations. Each platoon of each zone is run by a Duty Commander, who not only manages the platoon but responds operationally as a commander to emergencies within the zone. Each zone then has an overall Zone Commander, who manages on a zone based level. Three zones then make up an Area, which is managed by an 
Area Commander. In New South Wales there are 21 Zones which form 7 Areas.

The 7 Areas are split between Metropolitan and Regional. The Metro Areas report to the Assistant Commissioner of Metropolitan Operations, whilst the Regional Areas report to the Assistant Commissioner of Regional Operations. Both of these officers then report to the Deputy Commissioner of Field Operations, who in turn reports to the Commissioner. This tiered system means that management can be tailored at each level to suit local operational needs.

Specialist Sections

Fire and Rescue NSW operate a number of specialist operational and support sections including;

Operational Communications – Responsible for Triple Zero call taking, dispatch and emergency communications, operating out of two Communications Centres at Alexandria and Newcastle.

Fire Investigation and Research – Responsible for investigating the cause and origin of fires (including the operation of Australia's first accelerant detection dogs), as well as research into fire behaviour and fire dynamics, who operate out of their base at Greenacre and their research centre at Londonderry.

Community and Fire Safety – Responsible for increasing community and business resilience to emergencies through community education as well as in the field assessments and inspections.

Education and Training – Responsible for providing education and training for firefighters, utilising the Emergency Services Academy at Orchard Hills.

Capability Management – Responsible for developing and enhancing Fire and Rescue's operational capabilities, including Firefighting, Rescue, HazMat, Incident Management and others. 

Specialised Operations – Responsible for managing Fire and Rescue's Rescue, USAR, HazMat, Bushfire and Aviation Sections. They run from a number of locations, mainly the Specialised Operations Centre at the Orchard Hills Academy.

Logistics – Responsible for equipment management and distribution, and the management and maintenance of Fire and Rescue's huge vehicle fleet and property infrastructure.

FRNSW operate a number of other specialist support sections include Finance, Governance and Legal, Information and Technology, People and Culture along with many others who support frontline firefighters and operations.

Community Fire Units

Community fire units (CFUs) are volunteer teams of local residents trained to safeguard their homes during a bushfire, until the fire brigades can get there, or to 'mop up' after a fire has passed so fire units can be released to attend more urgent incidents. CFU members are not firefighters. The aim of the CFU program is to reduce the impact of bushfires on the community and to protect life and property from bushfires. A typical team is made up of six to 12 members. Recruitment is within the local community. Local fire stations conduct regular training sessions with volunteers. The training focus is on bushfire education, prevention and preparation.

Operations

Responding from 355 Fire Stations across the state, Fire and Rescue NSW protect over 7 million people across New South Wales (over 90% of the state) from fires and emergencies and attend over 124,000 calls a year.

Fire

The majority of Fire and Rescue NSW's workload comes from fires, with the brigade responding to over 68,000 fire related calls in the 2017/18 period. These included over 6,000 structure fires, ranging from house fires to high rise fires and everything in between. Fire Rescue NSW's busiest station for fires is Ropes Crossing, who attend over 650 confirmed fires a year. FRNSW maintain a strong percentage of having 78% of structure fires contained to the room of origin, which can be attributed to the tenacity and hard work of firefighters, combined with the strong work of Fire Safety and Community Education. FRNSW attend an average of about 350 'Greater Alarm' fires a year, which are fires that require the attendance of four or more stations. The largest attendance at a structure fire in 2018 was a 9th Alarm Factory Fire in Seven Hills, which required more than 25 stations to get under control.

FRNSW also responded to close to 9,000 bushfires in 2017/18, including a number of major wild fires that destroyed thousands hectares of bushland along with hundreds of houses. FRNSW operate a dedicated Bushfire and Aviation Section, based at Sydney Olympic Park, which is co-located with the NSW Rural Fire Service Headquarters. FRNSW work closely with the NSW Rural Fire Service along with other agencies including the NSW National Parks and Wildlife Service and the NSW Forestry Corporation. Together, all four agencies come together to protect the state from bush and grass fires across all jurisdictions. In April 2018, over 70 FRNSW stations along with the RFS and NPWS attended a 17th Alarm Bush Fire which threatened hundreds of houses in Wattle Grove, Holsworthy, Menai and Alfords Point. Together, firefighters worked to prevent a single property loss as a result of the fire.

Rescue

As the largest rescue provider in the state, Fire and Rescue NSW responded to over 12,000 rescues in 2017/18. Fire and Rescue NSW are equipped to deal with all
varieties of rescue incidents, including Domestic, Industrial, Road Crash, Transport, Confined Space, Vertical, Heavy Vehicle, Alpine, Trench, Bariatric, Swift Water, Large Animal and Collapse rescues. Along with standard ‘Primary’ and ‘Secondary’ rescue units, Fire and Rescue NSW operate 7 Heavy Rescues and 4 Technical Rescues across the metropolitan areas state, which carry an extensive array of heavy and technical rescue equipment.

Fire and Rescue NSW also operate one of Australia's two Urban Search and Rescue Task Forces (NSWTF1 / AUS-2), who are accredited as a Heavy USAR Team by the United Nations INSARG. The Team are based out of Sydney, with a number of operators and vehicles across the state capable of providing both a domestic and international capability. In 2011, Fire and Rescue NSW deployed the Team in a Heavy capacity twice to both the Christchurch Earthquake and the Japan Earthquake & Tsunami.

Hazardous Materials

Fire and Rescue NSW are the sole responsible agency for Hazardous Materials incidents in inland New South Wales. They attended over 16,000 hazardous conditions incidents in 2017/18, ranging from gas leaks

to chemical spills. Each station is equipped to deal with HazMat incidents to an extent, such as absorbing fuels, basic hydrocarbon booming, atmospheric monitoring and decontamination. Across the state, Fire and Rescue NSW operate 6 Heavy HazMats which are capable of dealing with more serious incidents, which are
supported by 25 intermediate HazMat stations regionally.

Additional capability is provided by the HazMat Advisory Response Team (HART), who can deploy on a statewide basis with a range of highly specialised equipment such as Raman and Infrared spectrometers. HART can also deploy the Otter II, their waterways response vessel, along with their mass decontamination units among other capabilities. Fire and Rescue NSW's Scientific Officers provide specialist scientific technical advise to crews statewide and can respond their mobile laboratory when required.

Emergency Response

Fire and Rescue NSW are on hand 24/7 every day of the year available to assist the residents in New South Wales in their times of need. Fire and Rescue NSW work closely with the NSW State Emergency Service to respond to incidents during and following storm/weather events, such as chainsawing downed trees, tarping roofs and pumping out flooded areas. This is in addition to Fire and Rescue NSW's flood/swift water rescue role. Another one of Fire and Rescue NSW's unique roles is their snake handling capability, with firefighters across the state trained in the safe capture and removal of snakes from peoples homes. Rescuing children and pets locked in cars forms another important part of Fire and Rescue NSW's role, particularly in hot Australian summers.

In eleven remote/rural locations across the state, Fire and Rescue NSW are involved in the Community First Responder (CFR) program. CFR involves firefighters responding to medical emergencies with NSW Ambulance, who are often located some distance away from the areas involved. Firefighters provide initial lifesaving patient care, who are supported by paramedics upon their arrival. Stations across the state are regularly called upon to assist NSW Ambulance in a general capacity also, often simply providing manpower and specialist equipment when needed. These are just some of the diverse range of public calls for assistance that Fire and Rescue NSW attend every year.

Fire engines (Appliances)

Pumpers

Rescue Appliances

Water Tankers

Aerial Appliances

HazMat Appliances

Support Appliances

Alpine Appliances

Community engagement
Fire and Rescue NSW engages in a variety of community training and education activities, and has partnered with GIO General to promote fire risk awareness and safety. Events such as Fire Prevention Week are organised by FRNSW during the year.

In 2011 FRNSW and GIO General created an advertising campaign to highlight the serious ramifications of fire in the domestic environment and to encourage people to use the free home fire safety audit tool - the advertising campaign was accompanied by a harrowing video telling the story of Linda, who not only suffered a brain injury in a domestic fire, causing her to have to learn to walk and talk again, but she also lost her sister to the blaze. Additionally FRNSW worked with GIO to create a tranche of informational fire safety videos.

As well as providing hands-on community support, FRNSW utilises their Twitter profile and Facebook page to engage with the wider NSW community.

See also

 Firefighting
 New South Wales Rural Fire Service
 Country Fire Service
 Country Fire Authority
 Australasian Fire and Emergency Service Authorities Council

References

External links

 Fire & Rescue NSW official website
 NSW Rural Fire Service Website
 Museum of Fire
 NSW Fire Brigade Employees Union
 Twitter profile
 Facebook page
 Annual Report
 NSW Fire Brigade Training Facility 

Government agencies of New South Wales
Emergency services in New South Wales
Fire and rescue services of Australia
1884 establishments in Australia